Kotkasim is a tehsil of Khairtal of the Indian state, Rajasthan.

Geography
Kotkasim is situated at latitude 28° 01' 45" N and longitude 76° 43' 15" E in the northern part of Alwar district of Rajasthan.

Kotkasim city is a Sub Divisional Headquarter along with an upgraded municipality also called a name of aero city work in under construction for newly airport. it is in the DELHI NCR Capital Region of Alwar district of Rajasthan state, India. Kotkasim is an education city and & surroundings industrial corridor & Corporate HUB. Khuskhera, Budhibawal, Bawal, Bhiwadi, Chopanki, Tapukara, Neemrana.
A large number of manufacturing units and factories near the town including, Honda CIAL, Honda Scooter, Shree Cement, Harley Davidson, ASHI India, Minda…. 10 Min Distance from Kotkasim City.

Kotkasim is in comes in Green Zone it means that here only can make residences already here 4 housing builders are making their flats like TSL building Pvt ltd, sunrise housing society, EWS societies are operational.

Kotaksim has many government offices:

 1 Government PG college (Bibirani college for general education).
 1 Government PG college for (government KDM colleges for Sanskrit education).
 1 Government ITI college.
 6 Private graduation institutions colleges.
 Electricity Board office (JVVNL) – 2 Power stations one is 220 KV GSS, 2nd 33KV & 2 Sub-power stations.
 2 Civil Courts & 1 SDM Court presence in Kotkasim.
 Roadways bus stand run by HONDA CIAL Cars.
 Work in Progress (International Airport), 2nd biggest airport in DELHI NCR REGION.
 PHED office.
 Government Hospital (CHC).
 4 Government Banks & 2 Semi-Government Banks are working in Kotkasim.
 1 Government Hostel for girls for BPL.
 Social Welfare Department (Sawtree by Phule)
 5 Government SS schools & 16 private education schools are running in Kotkasim.
 Nearest railway station – Rewari Junction 15 min distance from Kotkasim City.
 Nearest highway – National Highway 08 Distance 08KM.
 2 Mega highways – Kotkasim to Rewari, Kotkasim to Alwar.
 2 State highways – Kotkasim to Dharuhera & Kotkasim to Mundawar.

Kotkasim Airport
Kotkasim Airport worth Rs 10,669 Cr has been approved by Central Government. Work will start soon after the paperwork.
The above project is expected to be completed by 2027.

Location

It is easily reached from NH8 (Delhi-Jaipur-Mumbai highway) via GarhiBolni village. Regular buses connect KotKasim to Rewari, Gurgaon, Manesar, Kishangarh Bas, Dharuhera, Bhiwadi, Tijara and Alwar.

National Highway NH.08 distance 15KM.
Kotkasim town established in Mid of Mega highway Rewari to Alwar, state highway from Mundawar to Kotkasim, state highway Kotkasim to Tijara, Mega Highway Kotkasim to Dharuherea.

Famous Places
 2 Government PG colleges & 7 Gradation Colleges & 01 govt ITI college are present in the Kotkasim city.
 Most Popular Sweet Shops include Bikaner Rasgulla Bhandar, Jodhpur Misthan Bhandar.
 Asian Paint dealer (Vinod Machinery and Paint Store (Tilak Raj Gupta)).
 Famous well-crafted Tailors (Kartar Singh Near Post Office, B.D. Tailor).  
 Hardware Store (Tilak Machinery Store (Rajkumar Gupta) ). 
 Car Dealer (Fortune Cars).
 Bikes Dealer(Ajit motors, Yadav motors, SRM mortars). 
 Major banks available are SBI, PNB, BOB & SBBJ are in the Kotkasim city.
 Indane gas agency (kotkasim indane)
 Kotkasim Post Office and Indian Post Payment Bank. 
 Communities center: Ramleela maidan (Made in 20 Hectare land), Shiv Stadium, High School Khel Maidan, Aggarwal Dharmsala.
 Work in progress: International Airport in kotkasim. 2nd Airport In DELHI NCR Region.
 02 Civil Courts in presence in kotkasim. 01 SDM Court Presence in kotkasim.
 SUB Divisional Headquarters established in 2004 at Kotkasim.
 Rajiv Moter's for all car repairing 24*7 service available

Demography
Kotkasim had a population of 137,339 in the 2011 Census of India.

Language
Hindi & English, also called Hirwati, is spoken in Ahirwal.

Rewari, Mahendergarh, Narnaul, Gurgaon, Kotkasim, may be considered as the center of Ahirwati speaking area.

Kasimpur (1.5km) 

Karwar (11 km), Daika-1(3)Jhanpuri(7 km), Sanoda Ahir (5 KM), Doomhera (8 KM), Joria (8 km), binoliya [binola], Khanpur Dagran (4.8KM), Harsauli (27 km), Budhibawal (12 km), Badi Karoli (14 km) Katopur (10 km), Menawas (4 km) Nasopur (12 km), Moonpur Thakran (5 Km), Ladpur (1.6 km), Gheekaka (1.8 km), Kanharka (2.3 km) kanharka ki dhani (shyampuri) (2.5 km), Shri Chand Pura (4.4 km), Pur (4.4 km), Baghana (6.0 km), Gunsar (7.4 km), Neemlaka (6.02), Beelaheri (4 km), Rampur, Narwas(4.2 km), Kalgaon (10.5), Bibirani (7 km), Sherpur (4 km), Maswasi (madhopuri)(4 km) Majri 301707.

References

Cities and towns in Alwar district
Tehsils of Rajasthan